You may be looking for Pierre de Monte

Pietro del Monte (Petrus de Monte Brixensis) ( 1400 – 1457) was a Venetian jurist, canonist and humanist.

He studied at the University of Padua, as a student of Prodocimo de Conti and Giovan Francesco di Capodilista. He was papal collector in England from 1435–1440. Subsequently he was papal legate to France. He became Bishop of Brescia in 1442.

Works

Monarchia in qua generalium conciliorum materia de potestate prestantia & excellentia Romani pontificis & imperatoris plenissime discutitur , Lugduni, 1512, Romae 1537
De unius legis veritate et sectarum falsitate opus utilissimum & perspicacissimum, Mediulanum, 1522.
 
 
De potestate romani pontificis et generalis concilii, (composed 1434, printed Rome, 1476)
De Vitiorum inter se Differentia (composed 1438, unprinted), plagiarised from De Avaritia by Poggio Bracciolini

External links

1400s births
1457 deaths
Italian Renaissance humanists
Canon law jurists
Bishops of Brescia
15th-century Italian Roman Catholic bishops
15th-century Italian jurists
15th-century Venetian people